The Stichopodidae are a family of sea cucumbers, part of the order Synallactida.

Description
Members of this family are mostly large or medium-sized holothuroids with a squarish cross-section, a flat ventral surface, and large, fleshy, cone-shaped projections. Their mouths are surrounded by 20 peltate tentacles. They are usually found on soft substrates, such as sand or rubble.

Genera
List of genera according to the World Register of Marine Species: 
 genus Apostichopus Liao, 1980 (8 species, North Pacific)
 genus Astichopus Clark, 1922 (1 species, Caribbean)
 genus Australostichopus Levin in Moraes et al., 2004 (1 species, New Zealand and southern Australia)
 genus Eostichopus Cutress & Miller, 1982 (1 species, Caribbean)
 genus Isostichopus Deichmann, 1958 (3 species, warm East Pacific and Atlantic)
 genus Neostichopus Deichmann, 1948 (1 species, South Africa)
 genus Parastichopus Clark, 1922 (2 species, Atlantic and North Pacific)
 genus Stichopus Brandt, 1835 (13 species, Indo-Pacific)
 genus Thelenota Brandt, 1835 (3 species, Indo-Pacific)

References

 
Echinoderm families
Taxa named by Ernst Haeckel